The 13th Senate District of Wisconsin is one of 33 districts in the Wisconsin State Senate.  Located in south central Wisconsin, the district comprises most of Dodge County, the northern half of Jefferson County, and parts of eastern and northeastern Dane County.  It includes the cities of Beaver Dam, Columbus, Horicon, Lake Mills, Mayville, Oconomowoc, and Watertown.

Current elected officials
John Jagler is the senator representing the 13th district. He was first elected in a 2021 special election. He previously served 8 years in the State Assembly.

Each Wisconsin State Senate district is composed of three Wisconsin State Assembly districts.  The 13th Senate district comprises the 37th, 38th, and 39th Assembly districts.  The current representatives of those districts are: 
 Assembly District 37: William Penterman (R–Columbus)
 Assembly District 38: Barbara Dittrich (R–Oconomowoc)
 Assembly District 39: Mark Born (R–Beaver Dam)

The 13th Senate district, in its current borders, crosses three different congressional districts.  The portion of the district in Dane County falls within Wisconsin's 2nd congressional district, represented by U.S. Representative Mark Pocan; the portions within Columbia County and northern Dodge County are within Wisconsin's 6th congressional district, represented by U.S. Representative Glenn Grothman; the remainder of the district in Dodge, Jefferson, Washington, and Waukesha counties, falls within Wisconsin's 5th congressional district, represented by U.S. Representative Scott L. Fitzgerald.

Past senators
The district has previously been represented by:

Note: the boundaries of districts have changed repeatedly over history. Previous politicians of a specific numbered district have represented a completely different geographic area, due to redistricting.

References

External links
District Website
Senator Fitzgerald's Webpage

Wisconsin State Senate districts
Dane County, Wisconsin
Dodge County, Wisconsin
Jefferson County, Wisconsin
1848 establishments in Wisconsin